A Tulasi Vrindavana is a small podium-like stone or cement altar present in front of traditional Hindu houses, housing the sacred tulasi plant. Tulasi is an aromatic plant in the family Lamiaceae, native throughout the tropics, and widespread as a cultivated plant and an escaped weed.

The structure is also known as Tulasi Thara (Malayalam: തുളസിത്തറ), Tulasi Chaura or Tulasi Vrindavan, Tulasi Brindavanam, and Tulasi Brundavanam (Telugu: తులసి బృందావనం) in Indian regional languages.

Significance

Hindu literature personifies the tulasi plant as the goddess Tulasi. According to a legend from the Brahma Vaivarta Purana, Saraswati, Ganga, and Lakshmi were the three wives of the preserver deity, Vishnu. An argument once ensued between a resentful Saraswati and Ganga, with the latter being accused of trying to get too close to their common husband. Lakshmi attempted to pacify both of them, but in the ensuing quarrel, the three of them had cursed each other to be incarnated on earth: Saraswati and Ganga became rivers, while Lakshmi incarnated as the tulasi plant. 

In a different legend from the Devi Bhagavata Purana, Lakshmi incarnated herself as Tulasi, the daughter of King Dharmadhvaja. She married Shankacuda, a wicked asura who was the incarnation of Krishna's friend, Sudama. Shiva fought Shankacuda in a battle, but the latter proved to be an invincible opponent due to his wife's fidelity to him. Vishnu assumed the guise of Shankacuda, and made love to Tulasi, until she realised that he was an imposter. As she was about to curse him, Vishnu informed her of her true identity as his consort. Shiva was able to defeat the asura in the conflict. Liberated from earthly existence, Sudama returned to Goloka, while Tulasi transferred her earthly form to the tulasi plant, and rejoined Vishnu as Lakshmi in Vaikuntha.

Tulasi Vivaha 

A ceremony known as Tulasi Vivaha is performed by Hindus between Prabodhini Ekadashi (the eleventh lunar day of the waxing moon of Kartika) to Kartik Purnima (full moon in Kartika), usually on the eleventh or the twelfth lunar day. It is the ceremonial wedding of the goddess Tulasi, represented by the tulasi plant, to Vishnu, in the form of the symbolic shaligrama, or an image of Krishna or Rama. Both the bride and the groom are ritually worshipped, and then married as per traditional Hindu wedding rituals. It marks the end of the four-month Chaturmasya period, which corresponds to the monsoon, considered inauspicious for weddings and other rituals. This day inaugurates the annual marriage season in India.

Gallery

References

Objects used in Hindu worship
Archaeological features

Hindu practices
Plants in Hinduism
Odia culture